A sending/receiving relationship is one in which a public school district sends some or all of its students to attend the schools of another district. This is often done to achieve costs savings in smaller districts or continues after districts have grown as part of a historical relationship. The term is used in primary and secondary education in the states of New Jersey, Delaware, and Pennsylvania in the United States, although the concept exists in other states.

At times, the sending district may be granted representation on the receiving district's board of education. On the receiving district's board of education, the sending representative usually votes only on issues pertaining to the students received and district-wide issues. This is mainly to save money for the township and citizens who have to pay taxes for the school.

Demographic changes in either of the districts may cause the sending district to seek to end the relationship. Some districts have sought to gain local control of education methods and facilities by pulling out of existing sending relationships.

For example, the wealthy Englewood Cliffs Public Schools has sought to end its agreement with the heavily minority Englewood Public School District, to have its students pulled out of Dwight Morrow High School. This plan was vigorously opposed by the Englewood district and the New Jersey Department of Education. A magnet program has been attempted as a compromise to attract Cliffs parents to send their children to the Dwight Morrow school instead of opting for private education.

See also
Non-high school district

References

Education in New Jersey